HMS Belleisle was one of the four ships that were under construction for foreign navies in British shipyards which were purchased by the British government for the Royal Navy in 1878, at the time of the Russian war scare.

She was built in the Samuda Brothers shipyard at Cubitt Town, London, for service with the Ottoman Navy, under the name of Peik-i-Sheref, and was taken over for the Royal Navy in a completed condition. She was, however, not regarded as fit to serve as a British warship until a number of extensive and expensive modifications were carried out.

Design
She had been intended to carry 10-inch calibre guns, and the first recorded change is "enlargement of ports to take 25-ton guns" (i.e. guns of 12-inch calibre). Other major alterations included the building in of extra coal bunkers, the fitting of extra officers' cabins and the fitting of torpedo launching apparatus.

The main artillery was disposed in a centrally placed octagonal box battery with two guns on each beam. The firing ports were so arranged that it was possible to fire two guns ahead, astern and on  a limited bearing on either side. There were limited areas afore and abaft the beam where only one gun could be brought to bear; as the primary armament of this ship, as devised and designed, was her ram, this was regarded by her designer as an acceptable limitation.

Being smaller than other contemporary British battleships, she and her sister  had comparatively limited range, speed and armament.

Service history
She was commissioned on 2 July 1878, and served for the next fourteen years as coastguard ship at Kingstown, Ireland. Her only activity  there was firing practice four times a year, the annual squadron cruise, and one refit at Devonport. On 18 July 1886, she ran aground on the Pwllerochan Flat, in Milford Haven harbour. She was refloated later that day.
 
In 1887 while stationed in Kingstown Harbour (now Dun Laoghaire) the Commanding Officer invited the entire Water Wag Club to come on board on Tuesday 21 June to celebrate Queen Victoria's Golden Jubilee. The Water Wags declined the invitation as they were on a Jubilee Cruise to Dalkey Island and did not wish to miss the favourable tide.

She paid off into the "B" Reserve in April 1893, descending into the Fleet Reserve in May 1894. She was paid off in May 1900 and converted into a target ship.

There, she was used to test the effect of guns of 6-inch and of 9.2 inch calibre, and of torpedoes. The torpedo experiments were expected to demonstrate the protective effect of cellulose against these weapons; the cellulose was expected to swell and plug the holes caused by the torpedoes. This did not happen, and Belleisle sank into the mud. She was raised with difficulty in October 1903 and sold for scrap to Germany.

References

Oscar Parkes, British Battleships   
Conway, All the World's Fighting Ships  

Belleisle-class ironclads
Ships built in Cubitt Town
1876 ships
Victorian-era battleships of the United Kingdom
Maritime incidents in July 1886